Satellite Award for Best Actress - Drama can refer to:

 Satellite Award for Best Actress – Motion Picture or
 Satellite Award for Best Actress – Television Series Drama